Te Ao Mārama is a concept of the world in Māori culture. Te Ao Mārama, also known as Te Ao Tūroa ("The Long-Standing World"), refers to the physical plane of existence that is inhabited by people, and is associated with knowledge and understanding. The phrase is variously translated as "The World of Light", "the World of Understanding" and "the Natural World".

Concept

Te Ao Mārama is a part of the cosmological whakapapa that features in the creation story of Rangi and Papa. It is the third and current phase of the creation of the world, after Te Kore and Te Pō. Te Kore was the primordial era at the beginning of time (variously a void or a world of chaos depending on tradition and interpretation), while Te Pō, the world of darkness and potential, was the world in which atua (gods and spirits) were born into. Te Ao Mārama was created when the Gods separated Ranginui (the God of the Sky) and Papatūānuku (the Goddess of the Earth). 

Traditionally in Māori worldviews, most ordinary matter in life was seen as originating from Te Ao Mārama, while metaphysical concepts such as mana and tapu were seen as originating from Te Pō.

Modern usage 

Te Ahukaramū Charles Royal developed Te Ao Mārama paradigm of Māori epistemology in 1998. Royal used the term Te Ao Mārama to describe the worldview and cultural context from which all Mātauranga Māori (traditional knowledge) was able to develop from.

References 

Religious cosmologies
Māori culture
Māori mythology
Māori society
Māori words and phrases
Polynesian mythology